The Box is a five-CD/one DVD career-spanning box set by popular American group Chicago and was compiled and released through Rhino Records in 2003. The set was authorized by the band, who helped choose material from its entire back catalogue.

The box includes material from every studio album released by the band since its 1969 debut Chicago Transit Authority to its late 1990s recordings, along with a few rarities, notably three songs from the then-unreleased 1993 Stone of Sisyphus project. Every charting single from 1969 to 2003 is included, with the exception of the 1986 remake of the band's earlier hit, "25 or 6 to 4."

An additional DVD sports rare live recordings from 1972 and promotional material for 1979's Chicago 13. The set also includes a booklet of additional material featuring track-by-track analysis, promotional photos, essays and variations on the familiar Chicago logo.

The set did not chart in the US or the UK.

Track listing

Disc 6: DVD

Features live material from 1972 and promotional videos for Chicago 13 in 1979.

Personnel
Dawayne Bailey - electric guitar, lead & background vocals
Peter Cetera - electric bass, lead & background vocals, acoustic guitar
Bill Champlin - keyboards, lead & background vocals, guitar
Donnie Dacus - guitar, lead & background vocals
Laudir de Oliveira– congas, percussion, background vocals
Bruce Gaitsch - guitar
Keith Howland - guitar, background vocals
Tris Imboden - drums, harmonica
Terry Kath - guitar, lead & background vocals, bass, percussion
Robert Lamm - piano, keyboards, percussion, lead & background vocals
Lee Loughnane - trumpet, flugelhorn, percussion, background vocals
James Pankow - trombone, percussion, background vocals
Walter Parazaider - saxophone, flute, woodwinds, percussion, background vocals
Chris Pinnick - guitar
Jason Scheff - bass, lead & background vocals
Danny Seraphine - drums, drum programming, percussion, background vocals

References

Rhino Records compilation albums
Albums produced by Bruce Fairbairn
Albums produced by Tom Dowd
Albums produced by James William Guercio
Albums produced by Phil Ramone
Albums produced by Roy Bittan
Albums produced by Ron Nevison
Chicago (band) compilation albums
2003 compilation albums